Victoria Fyodorova (formerly Pouy; January 18, 1946 – September 5, 2012) was a Russian-American actress and author. She was born shortly after World War II to Jackson Tate (1898–1978), then a captain in the United States Navy, and Russian actress Zoya Fyodorova (1909–1981), who had a brief affair before Tate was expelled from Moscow by Joseph Stalin. Victoria Fyodorova wrote the 1979 book, The Admiral's Daughter, which was about her experience attempting to reunite with her father.

Early life
Fyodorova's mother, Zoya Fyodorova, was a well-known Soviet actress starting in the 1930s. In 1945, she met United States Navy Captain Jackson R. Tate (died 1978), a State Department deputy attaché stationed in Moscow; and they had an affair. Tate was warned to end the relationship by the Soviet Secret Police.

When Stalin learned of the affair, Tate was declared persona non grata and expelled from Russia. Zoya Fyodorova was arrested and sent to Siberia for eight years. Their daughter, Victoria, was named for V-E Day. Victoria lived with her mother's sister in the Kazakh SSR until she was 8 years old, when her mother was released, after Stalin's death. Victoria was also an actress in Russia, as her mother had been. She appeared in a number of well-received films, including a 1970 adaptation of Crime and Punishment. She was married briefly and divorced.

Reunion
University of Connecticut professor Irene Kirk learned of Victoria's story in 1959 and spent years trying to find Tate in the United States. Tate was unaware of having a daughter and of his former lover's arrest and imprisonment. When Kirk found Tate in 1973, she carried correspondence back and forth between the two.

In 1974, Tate began a campaign to convince the Soviet government to allow his daughter to travel to see him. She was granted permission and arrived in the United States in March 1975 on a three-month travel visa. She spent several weeks in seclusion with her father in Florida. While in the United States, she met Frederick Pouy, a pilot for Pan American World Airways; and they married on June 7, 1975, in Stamford, Connecticut, days before her visa was to expire. Their son, Christopher Alexander Fyodor Pouy, was born on May 3, 1976. Zoya Fyodorova petitioned the Soviet government and was allowed to travel to the U.S. to be with her daughter for the birth. Zoya died from a gunshot wound in 1981 under circumstances never fully explained.

Later life
Victoria Fyodorova settled in Stamford, Connecticut. She appeared as a Russian doctor in an episode of Medical Center in 1975, and in the 1985 movie Target. She and Pouy divorced in 1990. Fyodorova died from lung cancer on September 5, 2012 in Greenwich Township, Pennsylvania.

Selected filmography
 1964 — Goodbye, Boys as Zhenya
 1965 — Two in Love as Natasha
 1970 — Crime and Punishment as Avdotya Romanovna
 1970 — About Love as Galina
 1980 — Yulya’s Diary as Julia Voznesenskaya
 1985 — Target as Lise
 1986 — MacGyver as Victoria Tomanova

Bibliography

See also

 Victoria Fyodorova bio at Lifeactor.ru

References

1946 births
2012 deaths
Russian film actresses
Russian people of American descent
American people of Russian descent
American film actresses
Soviet emigrants to the United States
Writers from Stamford, Connecticut
Soviet people of American descent
21st-century American women